Spatulipalpia pallicostalis is a moth of the family Pyralidae first described by Francis Walker in 1863. It is found in Australia and probably in India and Sri Lanka.

References

Moths of Asia
Moths described in 1863
Phycitini